The Chapel and Lovelace Hall, Marion Military Institute were listed on the National Register of Historic Places in 1978.

They are the two surviving buildings from the 1854-58 Howard College campus.  Howard College moved in 1887 to Birmingham, Alabama and the Colonel James Thomas Murfee stayed behind to open Marion Military Institute.

References

University and college academic buildings in the United States
National Register of Historic Places in Perry County, Alabama
School buildings completed in 1854
Marion, Alabama